Alfredo María Aranda Obviar (29 August 1889 – 1 October 1978) was a Filipino bishop the founder of the Congregation of the Missionary Catechists of Saint Thérèse of the Infant Jesus, and was Bishop of Lucena until his death. His cause for beatification is currently underway, having been declared Venerable by Pope Francis.

Early life
Alfredo María Obviar y Aranda was born on 29 August 1889 in Mataás na Lupa, Lipa, Batangas to Telesforo Obviar and Florentina Catalina Aranda. He became an orphan at the early age, and was put under the care of his relatives from his mother’s side.  

Obviar received his early religious instruction at the College of St. Francis Xavier in Manila run by the Society of Jesus, where he graduated in 1901. He earned his degree in Bachelor of Arts at Ateneo de Manila in 1914, and proceeded to the University of Santo Tomas Pontifical Seminary for his theological studies.

Obviar received the sacerdotal ordination on 15 March 1919. His pastoral ministry began that same year at Luta (now Malvar, Batangas) and he continued as vicar of the cathedral-parish in Lipa from 1927 to 1944. In both parishes, he established Catechetical Centers in the población and the barrios. He was also Vicar General for the Diocese of Lipa, and was appointed confessor and chaplain of the Carmelite Monastery of Lipa.

Religious life
On March 11, 1944 Obviar was appointed the first Auxiliary Bishop of Lipa. After 25 years in the ministry, Obviar was appointed to the episcopate on 29 June 1944, with Guglielmo Piani, Apostolic Delegate, as Principal Consecrator, and with Pedro Paulo Santos Songco, Bishop of Caceres (Naga) and César Marie Guerrero, Titular Bishop of Limisa, Tunisia as Co-Consecrators. He also became Titular Bishop of Linoë, Turkey from 11 March 1944 to 21 June 1959. When Linoë was an active diocese, it was part of the Ecclesiastical Province of Nicaea.

On 22 January 1951, Obviar was installed as Apostolic Administrator of the new Diocese of Lucena. Motivated by his great work for catechesis, he founded the Missionary Catechists of St. Therese (MCST) on August 12, 1958. He established the Missionary Catechists of Saint Thérèse of the Infant Jesus (MCST), with the help of Mother Mercy Medenilla, who became the first superior of the MCST, and has four other women. The earliest monastic MCST was founded in San Narciso, Quezon.

To compensate for the shortage of priests in the new diocese, Obviar also founded the Our Lady of the Most Holy Seminary which was later renamed as Our Lady of Mount Carmel Seminary, a minor seminary in Sariaya, Quezon. Decades after, a major seminary was founded by the Diocese of Lucena re-institutionalizing the name Our Lady of the Most Holy Rosary Seminary. The establishment of this increased the number of priests attending from 1951 to 1975. In the year of his retirement, it had increased by more than 100 priests. Obivar ordained Ricardo Jamin Vidal to the priesthood on St. Patrick's Day, 17 March 1956, in Lucena; Vidal would later become a cardinal and Archbishop Emeritus of the Archdiocese of Cebu.

From 11 October 1962 to 8 December 1962, Obviar was a Council Father at the first Session of the Second Vatican Council.
	
After more than 18 years as Administrator, Obviar was declared the first diocesan bishop of the Diocese of Lucena on July 15, 1969. He served as Bishop of Lucena until his retirement in 1976.

Death
Obviar died at the age of 89, in Lucena, Quezon, on 1 October 1978, on the feast of his patron saint Thérèse of the Child Jesus.

Veneration
Obviar has saint protocol number 2398, and was declared nulla osta Servant of God in 2005. Pope Francis named him as Venerable on 7 November 2018.

Notes

References
Hagiography Circle

External links
MCST website

1889 births
1978 deaths
20th-century Roman Catholic bishops in the Philippines
Ateneo de Manila University alumni
University of Santo Tomas alumni
Filipino Servants of God
People from Lipa, Batangas
People from Lucena, Philippines
Roman Catholic bishops of Lucena
Venerated Carmelites
Venerated Catholics by Pope Francis